The Bosnian Party (Bosanska stranka, BOSS) is a multi-ethnic left populist political party in Bosnia and Herzegovina. The party's president is Mirnes Ajanović.

External links
 Official web site

References

Political parties in Bosnia and Herzegovina